"The Council of Fifty" (also known as "the Living Constitution", "the Kingdom of God", or its name by revelation, "The Kingdom of God and His Laws with the Keys and Power thereof, and Judgment in the Hands of His Servants, Ahman Christ") was a Latter Day Saint organization established by Joseph Smith in 1844 to symbolize and represent a future theocratic or theodemocratic "Kingdom of God" on the earth. Smith prophetically claimed that this Kingdom would be established in preparation for the Millennium and the Second Coming of Jesus.

The political Kingdom of God, organized around the Council of Fifty, was meant to be a force of peace and order in the midst of this chaos. According to latter-day saint teachings, while Jesus himself would be king of this new world government, its structure was in fact to be quasi-republican and multi-denominational; therefore, the early Council of Fifty included both Mormons and non-Mormons. Although the Council played a significant role during the last few months of Joseph Smith's life, particularly in his campaign for President of the United States, the Council's role was mostly symbolic throughout the 19th century within the Church of Jesus Christ of Latter-day Saints. This was largely because the Council was primarily meant for a time when secular governments had ceased to function. Regular meetings of the Council ended in 1884 after the church publicly abandoned its theocratic aspirations. Some contend that the organization was technically extinguished when member Heber J. Grant died in 1945.

Establishment
In early Mormonism, God's Kingdom was thought of as an amalgamation between two distinct yet intimately related parts. The first is the Spiritual Kingdom of God which is represented on earth by the Church of Christ. This, latter-day saints believe, was described in the Book of Daniel 2:44–45 as the stone "cut out of the mountain without hands" that will roll forth to fill the whole earth. In Daniel, this kingdom was never to "be destroyed; and the kingdom shall not be left to other people, but it shall break in pieces and consume all these kingdoms, and it shall stand forever." However, in conjunction with this Spiritual Kingdom, Joseph Smith and other early Latter Day Saint leaders believed that Jesus would establish a Political Kingdom of God in the turbulent times leading up to His second coming. God's Political Kingdom was to be centered around the Council of Fifty.

Like many in the mid-19th century, the Latter-Day Saints believed that the second coming of Jesus was imminent, and would be attended by great destruction. After this destruction occurred, some structure would be necessary to politically organize the survivors. Joseph Smith said he received a revelation on April 7, 1842 calling for the establishment of an organization called the Living Constitution, or later the Council of Fifty. This would serve as the foundation for the establishment of Christ's Millennial government. However the actual organization of the Council of Fifty by Joseph Smith in Nauvoo, Illinois on March 11, 1844, was due to a present danger rather than a millennial belief. William Law was organizing a band of men to overthrow and murder Joseph Smith and his brother, Hyrum Smith. On March 26, 1844, it appears Joseph conferred the keys of ecclesiastical authority on the Twelve Apostles in a meeting of the Council of Fifty, telling them "It may be that my enemies will kill me...should any of you be killed, you can lay your hands upon others and fill up your quorum. ...if you are called to lay down your lives, die like men." The timing of the last meeting of the Law conspiracy appears to have been Sunday, March 31, as Joseph told two young men who were infiltrating the conspiracy, "If you have to die, die like men... but I hardly think they will [kill you], as you are so young." The similarity in the foreboding sentiment expressed to the apostles and to the young spies is striking.

For some reason the conspiracy did not immediately attack after the conspirators took their murderous oaths as witnessed by the two spies. Perhaps believing the danger was past, Joseph Smith was "chosen as our Prophet, Priest, and King by Hosannas," as recorded by "clerk of the Kingdom", William Clayton, on April 11, 1844. However Law and his conspirators would go on to publish the Nauvoo Expositor, starting a chain of events leading to Joseph's death on June 27, 1844. It is worth noting that Joseph Smith ordered the destruction of the printing press after the first publication, and that action by Joseph contributed to the chain of events that lead to his death.

According to John D. Lee, the official scribe of the Council, the organization was meant to be the "Municipal department of the Kingdom of God set upon the earth, and from which all law emanates, for the rule, government & controle of all Nations Kingdoms & toungs and People under the whole Heavens."

Composition and organization
Unlike other purely religious organizations formed by Joseph Smith, members of the Council of Fifty were not necessarily Latter Day Saints. At its formation, there were three non-Mormon members: Marenus G. Eaton, who had revealed a conspiracy against Smith by Nauvoo dissenters; Edward Bonney, whose brother was a Mormon but who later acted as prosecutor against Smith for his role in the destruction of the Nauvoo Expositor; and Uriah Brown. Their admittance reflected Mormon teachings that the Millennial theocracy would be multi-denominational, though Jesus himself would be king. Although Brigham Young did not admit non-Mormons to the Council during his administration, he invited both Mormons and non-Mormons to be part of the theocracy, and even part of the theocratic government. All three nonmembers would be expelled in early 1845 once Brigham Young became chairman of the council.

Smith served as the president of the Council during his lifetime, after which Brigham Young presided, and then John Taylor. The Quorum of the Twelve Apostles, who each were members of the Council, had a special leadership role. However, all actions by the body were officially to be taken only after unanimous vote. During Smith's lifetime, meetings of the Council were held in secret. Council meetings were conducted at many locations in Nauvoo including Joseph Smith’s store, the Seventies Hall but also in the Nauvoo Mansion, the Masonic Hall, and the attic level of the Nauvoo Temple.

The Council of Fifty met irregularly for most of its forty-year existence, including March–June 1844, 1845–1846, more regularly from 1848 to 1850, then only a handful of times between 1851 and 1868. The council was reconstituted under President John Taylor in April 1880 and met more regularly for another five years.

Alpheus Cutler referred to an executive council within the Council of Fifty, which he termed the "Quorum of the Seven". Willard Richards served as historian/recorder from 1844 to his death in 1854. George Q. Cannon was the final recorder for the Council and served from 1867 to his death in 1901. William Clayton served as clerk of the Kingdom from 1844–1879. In 1880, he was followed in office by L. John Nuttall. John Taylor's son William Whittaker Taylor was assistant clerk from 1880-1884.

There are forty-six known members of the pre-martyrdom Council of Fifty. It included all members of the Quorum of the Twelve Apostles at the time in which it was active both in Nauvoo and in Utah. Notably, it did not include the two counselors to the First Presidency in Nauvoo, Sidney Rigdon and William Law. Other members included:

 John Milton Bernhisel
 William Clayton
 Alpheus Cutler
 David Fullmer
 Benjamin F. Johnson
 John D. Lee (Scribe)
 Cornelius P. Lott
 William Marks
 Isaac Morley
 John E. Page
 W.W. Phelps
 Charles C. Rich

Role of the Council in Joseph Smith's administration
While much of the rhetoric in Council of Fifty meetings focused on the council's millennial reign, in practice, the council performed two duties during its brief existence under Joseph Smith. First, it sought out territorial lands for Mormons to settle, primarily in Texas and Oregon territory. The council sent emissary and council member Lucien Woodworth to meet with Sam Houston and the Texas government, then an independent nation. The council also sent emissaries to Washington, D.C. to meet with members of Congress in the hopes of passing a resolution to allow Joseph Smith to be appointed General and march 100,000 volunteers to Oregon Territory.

The second duty of the Council was to assist in Joseph Smith's 1844 campaign for President of the United States. Smith ran on a platform among church members of bringing restitution for land and property lost in Missouri, eliminating slavery, compensating slave-owners with the sale of private lands, reducing the salaries of members of Congress, eliminating debt imprisonment, etc. Members of the Council campaigned throughout the United States. Besides sending out hundreds of political missionaries to campaign for Smith throughout the U.S., they also appointed fellow members of the Fifty as political ambassadors to Russia, the Republic of Texas, Washington D.C., England, and France. However, Smith was murdered by a large mob in the midst of his presidential campaign. The campaign was meant to draw greater attention to the plight of the Mormons, who had received no state or federal restitution for hundreds of thousands of dollars worth of property lost to mob violence in relation to the 1838 Mormon War. However, the Nauvoo Expositor incident, Smith's Presidential campaign, and even hyperbolic and inaccurate rumors about the Council of Fifty helped create the local unrest that led to his assassination.[citation]

Role of the Council in the Utah Territory and state of Utah

 
After Smith's death, the Council anointed Brigham Young its leader, and as the "king and president" of the Kingdom of God. Under Young, the council helped organize the trek west from Nauvoo in 1846, and it largely governed the unorganized territory of Utah until Congress granted territorial status in 1850.

The Council assisted in the Mormon Exodus from Nauvoo, Illinois and the eventual migration to the Great Basin area of what is now Utah. Young relied upon the results of scouting missions by members of the Council in choosing the Great Basin as a destination for their exodus from Nauvoo, over several alternate possibilities including Texas, California, Oregon, and Vancouver Island.

The council was to act as a legislative body in the Kingdom of God, and in Utah, the Council became a provisional legislative body in the government. This continued until September 1850 when Congress organized the Utah Territory upon petition by the church. After Utah became a territory, the American expectation for a separation between church and state sharply diminished the Council's official role in government. The Council then suspended meetings in October 1851. The council met again only briefly in 1867 and 1868 and voted for the establishment of Zion's Co-operative Mercantile Institution (ZCMI).

The Council resurfaced during the administration of John Taylor, to combat federal involvement in overseeing Utah elections. The Council's last recorded meeting was in 1884.

Publication of minutes
In 2013, the First Presidency of the LDS Church approved the publication of the minutes of the Council of Fifty as one of the upcoming volumes of the ongoing Joseph Smith Papers project. The minutes were published in September 2016.

See also

Anointed Quorum
Confederate Nations of Israel: a Mormon fundamentalist organization founded in 1977 and patterned after the Council of Fifty
List of members of the Council of Fifty

References

Sources

.
.
.
.
.
.
.
.
.
.
.
.
.
.
.

External links
 The Council of Fifty in Nauvoo, Illinois

1945 disestablishments in the United States
American Christian political organizations
Defunct Latter Day Saint organizations
History of the Latter Day Saint movement
Latter Day Saint hierarchy
Leadership positions in the Church of Jesus Christ of Latter-day Saints
Defunct organizational subdivisions of the Church of Jesus Christ of Latter-day Saints
Religious organizations established in 1844
1844 establishments in Illinois
Mormonism and politics